MV Qana or Gna was a Yemeni tanker, built in Japan in 1978. On 26 April 2009 it was hijacked of the coast of Yemen by Somali pirates but recovered by the Yemeni coastguard the following day. The captured Somalis were later found guilty of piracy. The ship was broken up in 2021.

Description and construction
The oil products tanker was built in 1978 as Yard 531 by the Japanese shipyard Tokushima Sangyo, at Komatsushima and launched for the government of South Yemen as Gna on 8 February 1978.

Gna was completed on 25 April 1978 and was registered at the port of Aden.  In 1983 the government transferred ownership to the Aden Refinery Company, and the tanker was used for distributing oil products to other Yemeni ports.

Hijacking
In initial unsuccessful attempts to regain control by the coast guard and the Yemeni Navy, two pirates were killed and seven captured.

The following day, Yemeni special forces stormed the ship using helicopters and recaptured it. Three further pirates were killed and four were captured. During the firefight five crew members, including one Indian, were injured. After the recapture, it was taken to Mukalla. The Yemeni forces also recaptured three smaller vessels which had been seized on the same day in a separate incident, killing two pirates and capturing at least four.

It was later stated that, during the incident on Qana, one Yemeni crew-member was killed, another was missing, and four others were wounded.

Trial
On 18 May 2010, six of the pirates were sentenced to death by a court in Sana'a, and six others sentenced to prison terms of 10 years each. In addition the pirates were ordered to pay 2 million Yemeni rials (about US$ 9200 in 2010) restitution to the ship's owner, some of which would be paid to the victims' families.

Aftermath
Following restoration of the tanker to the Aden Refinery Company, it was laid up in November 2009. In 2014, Gna was towed from the refinery to an anchorage off the port of Aden where, by October 2019, it had partially sunk. In April 2021 the tanker's status was reported as broken up.

Notes

References

Ships of Yemen
Maritime incidents in 2009
Piracy in Somalia
2009 in Somalia
1978 ships